No Regrets is the second studio album by American singer-songwriter Elisabeth Withers, released by E1 Records on September 14, 2010. The album features contributions by Toby Gad (who produced for her first album), Gordon Chambers, Carvin & Ivan, Barry Eastmond, Peter Lord, Clarence Blakely and Bob Antoine.

Track listing

Credits and personnel
The following credits are from Allmusic.

Management

Laurel Dann – A&R
Bob Perry – Executive producer
George Littlejohn -Executive producer
Russell Johnson – Executive producer
Damon Mendes – Executive producer
Elisabeth Withers – Executive producer
Paul Grosso – Creative Director

Mr. Andrew Kelley – Art direction, Design
Karen Fuchs – Photography
Teri Flore – Stylist
Jayda Audrick – Stylist
Sabrina Rowe – Make up, Hair stylist
Mark Weiss – Make up, Hair stylist

Producer

Bob Antoine
Ivan "Orthodox" Barias
Clarence Blakely
Barry J. Eastmond

Toby Gad
Carvin "Ransum" Higgins
Peter Lord
Elisabeth Withers

Engineering, Mixing and Arrangement

Ivan Barias – Instrumentation
Curt Chambers – Guitar
Gordon Chambers – Vocals, Background Vocals, Vocal Arrangement
Jean Baylor – Arranger, Background Vocals, Vocal Producer
Conya Doss – Background Vocals
Barry Eastmond – Keyboards, engineer, Drum Programming
Toby Gad – Instrumentation, engineer, Mixing
Josh Gannet – Mixing
Carvin Higgins – Arranger, engineer

Ali Irvin – Engineer, Background vocals
Kostadin Kamcev – Engineer
Peter Lord – Instrumentation, engineer
Arnold Mischkulnig – Mastering, Mixing
Bob Power – Mixing
Johnnie "Smurf" Smith – Keyboards, Instrumentation
Leonard "E-Flat" Stephens – Keyboards
Elisabeth Withers – Arranger, Vocals, Background Vocals, Vocal Arrangement, Vocal Producer
Paul Shaffer – Quotation author

References

External links
elisabethwithers.com — Elisabeth Withers Official Website

2010 albums
Elisabeth Withers albums
Albums produced by Toby Gad